The A30 is a major road in England, running  WSW from London to Land's End.

The road has been a principal axis in Britain from the 17th century to early 19th century, as a major coaching route. It used to provide the fastest route from London to the South West by land until a century before roads were numbered; nowadays much of this function is performed by the M3 (including A316) and A303 roads. The road has kept its principal status in the west from Honiton, Devon to Land's End where it is mainly dual carriageway and retains trunk road status.

Route

London to Honiton
The A30 begins at Henlys Roundabout, where the route stems from the A4 near Hounslow. It crosses the A312 before running south of the Southern Perimeter Road, Heathrow Airport and north of Ashford and Staines-upon-Thames, before reaching the M25 motorway orbital motorway. This first section is entirely dual carriageway.  Taken with the A4, its natural continuation which nearby becomes non-dualled towards the M25, the section constitutes one of five routes into the southern half of London which reach Inner London with at least a dual-carriageway, the others being the A3, the M3, the M20 and A2, however approximately one mile before reaching Inner London it is combined with the London variants of the M3 and M4 approaches.

After running astride the M25 to cross the Thames on a bridge designed by Lutyens, the Runnymede Bridge, the A30 runs parallel to but distant from the M3 until southwest of Basingstoke, bypassing Egham and passing through  heathland and Sunningdale, Bagshot bypass, and Camberley where the route almost mirrors the Devil's Highway, a stone (stane) street to Calleva Atrebatum (Silchester Roman town), believed to be older still, then passes close to Hook town centre and in the surrounding country the soil is arable.

After the 1930s Basingstoke bypass, the M3 changes direction (between North Waltham and Popham, at the Popham Interchange) the A303 takes over for  the A30 losing continuity.   From Sutton Scotney village the A30 runs parallel to the latter road as-the-crow-flies  to north-east of Honiton, Devon passing through towns Stockbridge (where it meets its first substantive river since the Thames, the Test) and its trout fishing centres, Shaftesbury, Sherborne, Yeovil, Crewkerne and Chard. Between Stockbridge and Shaftesbury it enters the cathedral city of Salisbury.

Between the M25 and Honiton, the A30 is mostly single carriageway, carrying local traffic with short stretches of dual carriageway from Camberley to Basingstoke, which has a dualled inner ring road, two between Stockbridge and Salisbury (an alike ring road shared with the A36), and between Sherborne and Yeovil.

Exeter to Penzance

This section is a trunk road as far as Penzance. It is mostly dual carriageway, but there are some short sections of single carriageway.

To pass Exeter, through traffic can join the M5 motorway for three miles. West of Exeter, the A30 is dual carriageway through Devon and into Cornwall, bypassing Whiddon Down, Okehampton and Launceston. The dual carriageway continues through Cornwall to Carland Cross, after which there is a single carriageway stretch to Chiverton Cross. Highways England are currently progressing plans to dual this section of carriageway. A Preferred Route Announcement was made July 2017 and a Development Consent Order was made in February 2020 by Secretary of State for Transport. Construction started in March 2020, with the road due to open to traffic by the end of 2023.

From Chiverton Cross, the dual carriageway bypasses Redruth and Camborne. The A30 returns to single carriageway west of Camborne, and a mid-1980s bypass takes the road around Hayle. Between Hayle and Penzance, the A30 returns to the original route and it passes through several villages. Approaching Penzance, the A30 briefly becomes a dual carriageway once again. Once west of Penzance, the A30 becomes a more rural road running through or past several villages, before terminating at Land's End.

History

17th – 18th centuries

The bulk of the A30 follows the historic London – Land's End coaching road. The road appeared on John Ogilby's map of Britain in 1675, and was covered by Ogilby's later strip-maps showing "The Road from London to The Land's End in Cornwall". The coaching route started at Hyde Park Corner, closer to the centre of London than the modern A30, closely mirroring the modern route as far as Exeter, except for three sections from Knightsbridge to Bedfont, Basingstoke to Salisbury via Andover and Exeter to Penzance via Ashburton, Plymouth and following the Cornish south coast via St Austell. Ogilby described it as "The Post-Office making this one of their Principal Roads" and thought the section through Surrey and Hampshire was "in general a very good Road with suitable Entertainment". The road was known to attract significant postal and coach traffic along its length by 1686.

The route is described as the "Great Road to Land's End" in the Magna Britannia, published in the early 19th century. As the coaching road to Land's End was a major route, it was a popular place for highwaymen. William Davies, also known as the Golden Farmer, robbed several coaches travelling across Bagshot Heath. He was hanged in 1689 at a gallows at the local gibbet hill between Bagshot and Camberley. The Jolly Farmer pub was built near the site of the gallows (gibbet), a junction.

19th century

At the turn of the 19th century, William Hanning created the "New Direct Road", a fast coaching route between London and Exeter. The road deviated from Ogilby's route running via Amesbury and Ilminster, rejoining the older road at Honiton. It became popular with postal services such as The Subscription. In 1831, a race was held between London and Exeter via the New Direct Road, which resulted in a dead heat.  were covered in 13 hours, compared to a typical early 18th century time of four days. In response to the competition of routes, a new turnpike road was built west of Chard, avoiding the historic route to Honiton via Stockland, with several steep hills. This road met the New Direct Road near Upottery.

Historically, the route between London and Land's End was also called the "Great South-West Road". In the 21st century, the name only refers to a small section of the road near Heathrow.

Redruth to Penzance
In 1825 an Act of Parliament established the Hayle Bridge Causeway and Turnpike Trust which was required to construct a bridge, causeway and turnpike over the Hayle River from Griggs Quay in the west to Phillack in the east. The turnpike was needed to ease the transport of copper ore to the port at Hayle for export. A second Act was passed in 1837 to establish the Griggs Quay to Penzance Turnpike and in 1839 an Act formed a third trust, the Hayle and Redruth Turnpike to complete the turnpike to Redruth. The running of the Causeway turnpike was overseen by the winner of a public auction and for the year 1880, the winning bid was £591 10s. In 1885 the management of the causeway by the turnpike came to an end, and the White house (tollhouse) on the eastern end of the Hayle causeway, along with the garden and three granite posts was put up for auction on 30 October 1885. A second tollhouse at Long Rock was also for auction as well as a number of posts and gates.

20th century

The A30 was one of the first roads to be classified by the Ministry of Transport for funding in 1921. It followed Ogilby's route up to Exeter, then the basic route of the modern A30 through Okehampton, Launceston and Bodmin to the Greenmarket in Penzance, where it ended. It was extended to Land's End in 1925.

The Great South West Road section of the A30 around Heathrow had been planned as the western end of the Great West Road project, one of the first bypasses built for motor traffic. Construction began in 1914 but was quickly halted because of World War I. It resumed construction in 1919. The full route from Chiswick to Ashford was opened by King George V on 30 May 1925.

Following the construction of a bypass around Basingstoke, the route of the A30 was changed on 1 April 1933 to run by Sutton Scotney and Stockbridge, rejoining the original route at Lopcombe Corner east of Salisbury. An alternative route, the A303 was created out of existing roads at the same time between Micheldever Station and the Blackdown Hills, that followed the basic course of Hanning's New Direct Road. The A30 remained the principal route between London and Exeter, until the A303 became a trunk road in 1958, receiving central Government funding and relegating the parallel A30 to a local road.

By the mid-20th century, large sections of the A30 were struggling to cope with the increasing demands of road traffic. In the mid-1960s, numerous councils complained that the Secretary of State for Transport, Barbara Castle, decided that improvements to the A38 from Exeter to Plymouth were of higher priority for funding than any work on the A30. Cornwall County Council complained that the A30 through the county was narrow and twisted, and known as the "stage coach trail".

Following World War II, the Ministry of Transport planned a large-scale upgrade of the A30 across south-west England, with the eventual intention that most of the route would be at least dual-carriageway. The M3 motorway was planned as a replacement for the A30 between London and Popham. Following a public enquiry in 1966, the line was fixed the following year. The work was completed as far as Bagshot in 1971, then to Sunbury-on-Thames in 1974. In 1971, the Secretary of State for the Environment, Peter Walker announced many upgrades of the A30 across Devon and Cornwall, identifying the section from Okehampton to Bodmin as a key area of improvement.

The  Honiton dual-carriageway bypass opened in early December 1966 at a cost of £984,000. The Hayle bypass was first proposed in the late 1970s. It was controversial, and Dora Russell protested against its construction. It was completed in 1985.
 The Okehampton bypass, which opened on 19 July 1988, goes to the south of the town, cutting through the northern edge of Dartmoor National Park in Devon. In the 1980s, the route of the bypass was the subject of a prolonged campaign from conservationists, including Sylvia Sayer, who preferred a route to the north of the town through agricultural land.

The section between Honiton and Exeter in East Devon was upgraded in 1999 to dual carriageway, giving quicker access to Exeter International Airport. This road was built under the Design Build Finance Operate (DBFO) scheme by the private consortium Connect A30, who receive a shadow toll from the Government for each vehicle travelling along the road. Archaeological investigations during the work found a Roman cavalry garrison and later settlement at Pomeroy Wood. There were several protests by environmentalists during construction and the particular nature of the DBFO scheme, with a long-lasting occupation of sites on the planned route, focused around Fairmile. Swampy received press attention for his part in this protest. In 2016, President of The Automobile Association, Edmund King, claimed that the action had led to a slowdown in road construction throughout Britain.

21st century

During 2006 one of the main bottlenecks on the road was removed when the Merrymeet roundabout between Okehampton and Exeter near Whiddon Down was replaced with a grade-separated junction and dual carriageway.

Since the Bodmin to Indian Queens project was completed in late 2007, the new dual carriageway runs to the north of Goss Moor. The previous road has been converted to a cycle lane. In December 2012 it was announced that  from Temple to Higher Carblake would be upgraded to a dual carriageway. Building started in early 2015, and was completed in summer 2017. This work made the A30 continuous dual carriageway between the M5 at Exeter and Carland Cross in Cornwall.

On 17 January 2008, British Airways Flight 38 crash-landed near the Great South West Road southeast of Heathrow Airport. Shortly before the crash landing, the captain of the Boeing 777 involved was able to clear the A30 by raising the flaps, saving the lives of motorists on the ground.

In 2014, the A30 was identified as one of several key routes in the Government's Road Investment Strategy, turning it into a strategic corridor for southwest England. This includes further dual carriageway improvements east of Honiton towards the Blackdown Hills and between Chiverton Cross and Carland Cross.

In 2022, the casket of Queen Elizabeth II was driven partially on this road en route to Windsor Castle, her final resting place.

Future proposals

Carland Cross to Chiverton Cross
Dualling of the stretch between Carland Cross and Chiverton Cross would establish a continuous dual carriageway from Exeter right through to Camborne. Although this was shelved in 2006 as it was not considered a regional priority, it was included within the government's Road Investment Strategy in 2014. The preferred route was announced in July 2017, and on 6 February 2020, the Secretary of State for Transport approved Highways England's application for a Development Consent Order for the scheme to be constructed. Work began in March 2020 with anticipated completion in 2023 for an estimated cost of £330 million, with a total of £20 million being provided by the European Regional Development Fund. The scheme is included as a case study in the Department for Transport's document Road Investment Strategy 2: 2020–2025. The current route of the road passes near a World Heritage Site, a Registered Park and Gardens and a number of Sites of Special Scientific Interest. The proposed scheme includes a 20-metre-wide 'green bridge' over the new road to promote connectivity and biodiversity.

Cultural references
John Betjeman referred to the A30 in his poem "Meditation on the A30". Arthur Boyt, focus of BBC documentary The Man Who Eats Badgers, described the A30 near Bodmin Moor as a good road for finding roadkill.

In Monty Python's Flying Circus, episode 34: The Cycling Tour, Mr Pither laments "As I lay down to the sound of the Russian gentlemen practising their shooting, I realised I was in a bit of a pickle. My heart sank as I realised I should never see the Okehampton by-pass again...", just before his impending execution in Russia.

Musician, educator and YouTube personality Rick Beato, interviewing Brian May of the band Queen in 2021, asked him (about the band), "How often would you tune?" to which May replied, "Not often enough, some people would say. We used to say we tuned to the A30."

References

Notes

Citations

Sources

 

Anti-road protest
Roads in England
Roads in Cornwall
Roads in Devon
Roads in Dorset
Roads in Hampshire
Roads in Surrey
Roads in Wiltshire
Streets in the London Borough of Hounslow